The Arab Malaysians consists of people of full or partial Arab descent (specifically Hadhrami, other Southern Arabian and Gulf Arab descent) who were born in or immigrated to Malaysia.

Arab traders had been visiting Southeast Asia since pre-Islamic times, as Southeast Asia was well connected via the sea route to the markets of Arabia, Persia and China. These Arab traders came from all over the Arabian Peninsula, today comprising the nations of Oman, Yemen, Qatar, Kuwait, Bahrain and other GCC nations. The earliest Arab traders followed Orthodox Christianity, Arabian traditional religion and other religions that had existed in Arabia before the advent of Islam. Islam was later introduced by Arab traders in Malaysia in the 7th and 8th centuries. Arab interest in Southeast Asia soared during the Islamic era, during which more Arab traders arrived to spread Islam. Many Arab migrants were incorporated into the royalty and assimilated into the local Malay culture rather than retaining their Arab identity.

The states of Kedah, Kelantan and Johor contain a high population of people with mixed Malay and Arab ancestry. Like the Arab diaspora residing in nearby countries such as Singapore, Indonesia, Brunei and the Philippines, Arab Malaysians are assimilated into Malay culture and more-often do not consider themselves "Arab". This was a historical trend of Arab traders in Southeast Asia who quickly assimilated into the native Austronesian culture.

See also
 Arab diaspora
 Arab Indonesians
 Arab Singaporean
 Arab Filipinos
 Hadhrami people
 Islam in Malaysia

Further reading
 
 
 
 
 

Arab
Malaysia
Immigration to Malaysia